William John Keen (1873–1958) served as the Chief Commissioner of the North-West Frontier Province of British India from 1925 until 1926.

Commissioned a Second Lieutenant in the British Army in 1892, he won promotion to Lieutenant in 1895 and to Captain of the Indian Staff Corps 19 November 1902. In 1910 he became a Major and was appointed a CIE in 1915.

References 

British people in colonial India
1873 births
1958 deaths
Royal Welch Fusiliers officers
Indian Staff Corps officers
Companions of the Order of the Indian Empire